Matt Visser  is a mathematics Professor at Victoria University of Wellington, in New Zealand.

Work
Visser's research interests include general relativity, quantum field theory and cosmology.

Visser has produced a large number of research papers on the subject of wormholes, gravitational horizons and notably the emerging subject of acoustic metrics.

He is the author of the reference book on the current state of wormhole theory, Lorentzian Wormholes — from Einstein to Hawking (1996) and co-editor of Artificial Black Holes (2002).

Awards 
In 2013 Visser was awarded the Dan Walls Medal by the New Zealand Institute of Physics.

Books
David L Wiltshire, Matt Visser & Susan Scott, The Kerr Spacetime: Rotating black holes in general relativity (2009) 
M Novello, Matt Visser & G E Volovik, Artificial Black Holes (2002) 
Matt Visser, Lorentzian Wormholes: From Einstein To Hawking (1995)

See also
 Roman ring

References

External links
Matt Visser's personalized homepage
research papers by Matt Visser on arXiv

New Zealand mathematicians
Fellows of the Royal Society of New Zealand
Academic staff of the Victoria University of Wellington
Living people
New Zealand people of Dutch descent
Year of birth missing (living people)
People educated at St Bernard's College, Lower Hutt
Fellows of the American Physical Society